Michael Farmer is an American academic and author.

Biography
Farmer attended Princeton University, where he graduated with A.B. in English literature before continuing on for an MBA at the Harvard Business School. He began his career as a weapon officer with US Navy. Later, he joined academia and became associate dean for policy and resources at the Harvard School of Public Health. For a brief period, he also served as a professor of naval science at Iowa State University.

In 1992, he founded Farmer & Company after working as a strategy consultant with Boston Consulting Group and Bain & Company.

In 2015, his book Madison Avenue Manslaughter was published which was reviewed by Financial Times and NZ Herald. He has also written for The Daily Telegraph.

Bibliography
 Madison Avenue Manslaughter (2015)

References

Living people
21st-century American writers
Princeton University alumni
Harvard Business School alumni
American university and college faculty deans
Year of birth missing (living people)